Velké Přítočno is a municipality and village in Kladno District in the Central Bohemian Region of the Czech Republic. It has about 1,000 inhabitants.

History
The first written mention of Velké Přítočno is from 1354.

Climate
Velké Přítočno is reported as the site with the lowest annual precipitation in the Czech Republic. In 1933 the annual total precipitation was 247 mm.

Notable people
Jaroslav Burgr (1906–1986), footballer

References

Villages in Kladno District